Green County is a county located in the U.S. state of Wisconsin. As of the 2020 census, the population was 37,093. Its county seat is Monroe. Green County is included in the Madison, WI Metropolitan Statistical Area.

History
The county was created in 1837 from the Wisconsin Territory. When in December 1837, a new county was to be split off from the over-large Iowa County, William Boyles of Monroe, as the Representative of the area, was allowed to choose a name. He chose Green County, after the verdant color of the vegetation there. Another member suggested that it be modified to "Greene" after General Nathanael Greene, who commanded the Southern Campaign in the American Revolutionary War but Boyles insisted on his original choice.The story that it was named for General Greene still persists in some circles.

Geography

Major highways

  Highway 11 (Wisconsin)
  Highway 39 (Wisconsin)
  Highway 59 (Wisconsin)
  Highway 69 (Wisconsin)
  Highway 78 (Wisconsin)
  Highway 81 (Wisconsin)
  Highway 92 (Wisconsin)
  Highway 104 (Wisconsin)

Railroads
Wisconsin and Southern Railroad

Buses
List of intercity bus stops in Wisconsin

Airport
Monroe Municipal Airport (KEFT) serves the county and surrounding communities.

Adjacent counties
 Dane County - north
 Rock County - east
 Winnebago County, Illinois - southeast
 Stephenson County, Illinois - south
 Lafayette County - west
 Iowa County - northwest

Demographics

2020 census
As of the census of 2020, the population was 37,093. The racial makeup of the county was 92.5% White, 0.6% Black or African American, 0.5% Asian, 0.3% Native American, 1.9% from other races, and 4.3% from two or more races. Ethnically, the population was 4.0% Hispanic or Latino of any race.

2000 census

As of the 2000 census, there were 33,647 people, 13,212 households, and 9,208 families residing in the county. The population density was 58 people per square mile (22/km2). There were 13,878 housing units at an average density of 24 per square mile (9/km2). The racial makeup of the county was 98.14% White, 0.26% Black or African American, 0.21% Native American, 0.29% Asian, 0.36% from other races, and 0.75% from two or more races. 0.97% of the population were Hispanic or Latino of any race. 31.9% were of German, 20.3% Swiss, 14.9% Norwegian, 6.7% Irish, 5.7% English and 5.5% American ancestry. 96.5% spoke English, 2.0% German and 1.1% Spanish as their first language.

There were 13,212 households, out of which 33.70% had children under the age of 18 living with them, 58.30% were married couples living together, 7.50% had a female householder with no husband present, and 30.30% were non-families. 25.00% of all households were made up of individuals, and 11.20% had someone living alone who was 65 years of age or older. The average household size was 2.51 and the average family size was 3.01.

In the county, the population was spread out, with 26.50% under the age of 18, 6.70% from 18 to 24, 29.20% from 25 to 44, 22.90% from 45 to 64, and 14.70% who were 65 years of age or older. The median age was 38 years. For every 100 females there were 96.90 males. For every 100 females age 18 and over, there were 94.20 males.

As late as the 1970 federal census, Green County was the only county in the United States in which the largest foreign-born population was people born in Switzerland.

Communities

Cities
 Brodhead (partly in Rock County)
 Monroe (county seat)

Villages
 Albany
 Belleville (mostly in Dane County)
 Brooklyn (mostly in Dane County)
 Browntown
 Monticello
 New Glarus

Towns

 Adams
 Albany
 Brooklyn
 Cadiz
 Clarno
 Decatur
 Exeter
 Jefferson
 Jordan
 Monroe
 Mount Pleasant
 New Glarus
 Spring Grove
 Sylvester
 Washington
 York

Census-designated place
 Juda

Unincorporated communities

 Attica
 Clarno
 Dayton
 Exeter
 Jordan Center
 Martintown
 Mineral Point
 Postville
 Oakley
 Ross Crossing
 Schneyville
 Schultz
 Stearns
 Twin Grove

Ghost towns/neighborhoods
 Clarence
 Farmers Grove
 Tyrone
 Willet

Politics
Until the 1992 presidential election, Green County voters primarily backed the Republican Party candidate in national elections. Prior to that year, the only times they failed to win the county were in the midst of a divided party vote in 1912, the presence of Wisconsinite Robert La Follette on the ballot in 1924, & national Democratic Party landslides in 1932, 1936, & 1964. From 1992 onward, the county has backed the Democratic candidate in every presidential election, though their margins of victory have been often relatively narrow.

See also
 National Register of Historic Places listings in Green County, Wisconsin

References

Further reading
 Commemorative Biographical Record of the Counties of Rock, Green, Grant, Iowa, and Lafayette, Wisconsin, Containing Biographical Sketches of Prominent and Representative Citizens, and of Many of the Early Settled Families. Chicago: J. H. Beers and Co., 1901.
 History of Green County, Wisconsin. Springfield, Ill.: Union Publishing Company, 1884.

External links
 Green County government website
 Green County map from the Wisconsin Department of Transportation
 Green County Sheriff's Office

 
1837 establishments in Wisconsin Territory
Populated places established in 1837